Cudworth may refer to:

Places
 Cudworth, Saskatchewan, Canada
 Cudworth, Somerset, England
 Cudworth, South Yorkshire, England
 Cudworth, Surrey, England
Cudworth Manor, Surrey, England
 Cudworth Airport, Saskatchewan, Canada
 Cudworth Municipal Airport, Saskatchewan, Canada
 Cudworth railway station, Cudworth, South Yorkshire, England

People
 Cudworth (surname)
 Georgie Cudworth - fictional character in "Dangerfield (TV series)"
 Benjamin Cudworth Yancey Jr. (1817–91), American lawyer, politician, soldier, and diplomat
 Norman Cudworth Armitage (1907–72), American saber fencer

Organisations
 Cudworth and Woodworth, architectural firm, Norwich, Connecticut, United States
 Cudworth Village F.C., football club, South Yorkshire, England